Linyanti Combined School is a school in the Linyanti Constituency in Namibia far north-eastern Caprivi Strip.

The school had 21 staff in 2012. Patron of the school is Namibia's Minister for Safety and Security, Nangolo Mbumba.

See also
 Education in Namibia
 List of schools in Namibia

References

Schools in Zambezi Region